= Duméril =

Duméril is a French surname. Notable people with the surname include:

- André Marie Constant Duméril (1774–1860) (author abbreviation in zoology: Duméril)
- Auguste Duméril (1812–1870), French zoologist, son of André
